The 2021 Leicestershire County Council election took place alongside the other local elections. All councilors were elected from electoral divisions by first-past-the-post voting for a four-year term of office.

Results

Overview 

|}

Results by Division

Blaby

Charnwood
(14 seats, 14 Electoral Divisions)

Harborough

Hinckley and Bosworth

Melton

North West Leicestershire

Oadby and Wigston

References 

Leicestershire County Council elections
2021 English local elections
2020s in Leicestershire